County lines can mean:

 Borders between counties
 County lines drug trafficking, the practice of trafficking drugs into rural areas and smaller towns in the United Kingdom